Victoria is a municipality in the Honduran department of Yoro.

It is served by Victoria Airport, a  grass airstrip.

Demographics
At the time of the 2013 Honduras census, Victoria municipality had a population of 33,019. Of these, 88.60% were Mestizo, 7.14% Indigenous (6.69% Tolupan), 3.63% White,  0.61% Black or Afro-Honduran and 0.02% others.

References

External links
 OpenStreetMap - Victoria

Municipalities of the Yoro Department